Francine Barron Mathews (born May 23, 1963) is an American writer of mystery and spy fiction who also writes historical mysteries under the name Stephanie Barron. She features in Great Women Mystery Writers (2007).

Biography
Francine Stephanie Barron was born in Binghamton, New York, and grew up in Washington D.C., the youngest of six sisters. She graduated from Georgetown Visitation Preparatory School, then earned a degree at Princeton University in European History. While there, she wrote for the university newspaper, which led to later jobs with The Miami Herald and The San Jose Mercury News. She pursued an MA at Stanford University in Latin American History, but left to work at the CIA for several years as an intelligence analyst. After the publication of her first book, she started writing full-time, citing John McPhee (who taught her at Princeton) and Elizabeth George as particular influences. She lives in Denver, Colorado, with her children and husband. Her husband, Mark, is a prominent lawyer in the area. Her eldest son, Sam, also went on to study at Princeton. Her youngest son, Stephen, went on to study at Penn State and is on the fencing team.

Writing

As Francine Mathews, she has written two series: one set in Nantucket featuring police officer Meredith "Merry" Folger, the latest in a long line of police officers in her family, including her father who is also her boss. Indeed, family and genealogy play an important part of the series. Mathews has stated that with this series she tried to "capture the difficult life in New England today" and the "bitter and embedded economic issues" facing the fishing industry. Her second series are spy thrillers based on her time working with the CIA.

As Stephanie Barron (her middle and maiden names), Mathews has written historical novels featuring the English novelist Jane Austen (1775–1817) as an amateur sleuth. The books are presented as lost diaries merely edited by Barron. Mathews has carried out considerable research into Austen as background to the series, especially using Austen's correspondence as a key source.

Published books

As Francine Mathews

Merry Folger series
 Death in the Off Season (1994)
 Death in Rough Water (1995)
 Death in a Mood Indigo (1997)
 Death in a Cold Hard Light (1998)
 Death on Nantucket (2017)
 Death on Tuckernuck (2020)

Caroline Carmichael series
  The Cut Out (2001)
  Blown (2005)

Other novels
 The Secret Agent (2002)
 The Alibi Club (2006)
 Jack 1939 (2012)
 Too Bad to Die (2015)

As Stephanie Barron

Jane Austen series
 Jane and the Unpleasantness at Scargrave Manor (1996)
 Jane and the Man of the Cloth (1997)
 Jane and the Wandering Eye (1998)
 Jane and the Genius of the Place (1999)
 Jane and the Stillroom Maid (2000)
 Jane and the Prisoner of Wool House (2001)
 Jane and the Ghosts of Netley (2003)
 Jane and His Lordship's Legacy (2005)
 Jane and the Barque of Frailty (2006)
 Jane and the Madness of Lord Byron (2010)
 Jane and the Canterbury Tale (2011)
 Jane and the Twelve Days of Christmas (2014)
 Jane and the Waterloo Map (2016)
 Jane and the Year Without a Summer (2022)

Other novels
 A Flaw in the Blood (2008)
 The White Garden (2009)
That Churchill Woman (2020)

References

External links
 
  (1994–2015)
 Stephanie Barron at LC Authorities, with 14 records (1996–2014)
 

1963 births
American mystery novelists
American spy fiction writers
Journalists from Washington, D.C.
Writers from Binghamton, New York
People from Golden, Colorado
Princeton University alumni
Stanford University alumni
Miami Herald people
Novelists from Colorado
Novelists from New York (state)
Living people
American women novelists
Women mystery writers
20th-century American women writers
21st-century American women writers
20th-century American novelists
21st-century American novelists
Women historical novelists
Women crime writers
Journalists from New York (state)
American women non-fiction writers
21st-century American non-fiction writers